Total Control is a crime novel written by David Baldacci. The book was initially published on January 1, 1997 by Warner Books.

References

External links

1997 American novels
Novels by David Baldacci